Pedinopistha is a genus of Hawaiian running crab spiders that was first described by Ferdinand Anton Franz Karsch in 1880.

Species
 it contains five species, found only on Hawaii:
Pedinopistha aculeata (Simon, 1900) – Hawaii
Pedinopistha finschi Karsch, 1880 (type) – Hawaii
Pedinopistha longula (Simon, 1900) – Hawaii
Pedinopistha schauinslandi (Simon, 1899) – Hawaii
Pedinopistha stigmatica (Simon, 1900) – Hawaii

See also
 List of Philodromidae species

References

Araneomorphae genera
Philodromidae
Spiders of Hawaii
Taxa named by Ferdinand Karsch